Pete Edward Jacobs (May 7, 1899 in Asbury Park, New Jersey – c. 1952) was an American jazz drummer.

Jacobs played in the Musical Aces, then joined the band of Claude Hopkins from 1926 to 1928. He left Hopkins to play with Charlie Skeete in 1928, then returned to play with Hopkins from 1928 until 1938. During this ten-year tenure in Hopkins's orchestra, Jacobs recorded extensively with the group on Brunswick Records, particularly during the period 1932 to 1927. Additionally, he appeared with the band in the short films Barbershop Blues (1933) and By Request (1936).

Jacobs fell ill in 1938 and had to quit the group, and never returned to active performance.

References
"Pete Jacobs", Grove Jazz online.
Eugene Chadbourne, [ Pete Jacobs] at Allmusic

Further reading
John Chilton, Who's Who of Jazz.

American jazz drummers
Musicians from New Jersey
People from Asbury Park, New Jersey
1899 births
1950s deaths
20th-century American drummers
American male drummers
20th-century American male musicians
American male jazz musicians